Palembang, also known as Palembang Malay, or Musi, is a Malayic language primarily spoken in about two thirds of South Sumatra Province in Indonesia, especially along the Musi River. It consists of two separate but mutually intelligible dialect chains: Musi and Palembang. The urban Palembang dialect is a koiné that emerged in Palembang, the capital city of South Sumatra. It has become a lingua franca throughout major population centers in the province, and is often used polyglossically with Indonesian and other regional languages and dialects in the area. Since parts of South Sumatra used to be under direct Malay and Javanese rule for quite a long time, the speech varieties of Palembang and its surrounding area are significantly influenced by Malay and Javanese, down to their core vocabularies.

The name Palembang can refer both to the urban Palembang dialect, distinct from Musi dialect proper, or to the whole Palembang/Musi dialect group. This term is also the most popular endonym for the language and is prominently used in the academic literature.

Phonology

Dunggio (1983) lists 26 phonemes for the Palembang dialect; specifically, there are 20 consonants and 6 vowels.

Vowels 

Consonants

Orthography
An orthography has been made by the local office of Language Development and Fostering Agency. It is closely related to the Indonesian Spelling System, and uses the Latin alphabet with the addition of the letter é.

Example text

References

Bibliography
 
 
 

Malayic languages
Palembang
Languages of Indonesia
Malay dialects